The 1938 Soviet Top League combined all the Groups into one Super League. 

The season started on May 10 with the game between FC Torpedo Moscow and FC Spartak Kharkiv in Moscow. The last game was played on November 14 between FC Dynamo Rostov-na-Donu and FC Dynamo Odessa in Rostov-na-Donu. Each team played once with every other. The point system changed as well and stayed this way to the end of the competition in 1991: 2 for win, 1 for draw, and none for loss. This all-National championship was experimental and was disbanded next year. A half of the League was relegated at the end of the season.

Spartak beside becoming the champion in the League format won the national cup competition, defeating a surprise team Elektrik from Leningrad, that last year was called Krasnaya Zarya.

Standings

Results

Top scorers
20 goals
 Makar Goncharenko (Dynamo Kiev)

19 goals
 Grigory Fedotov (CDKA Moscow)
 Aleksandr Ponomarev (Traktor Stalingrad)

18 goals
 Sergei Kapelkin (Metallurg Moscow)
 Aleksei Sokolov (Spartak Moscow)

15 goals
 Pyotr Petrov (Torpedo Moscow)
 Aleksandr Sinyakov (Torpedo Moscow)

14 goals
 Arkadi Alov (Dynamo Leningrad)
 Pyotr Layko (Dynamo Kiev)
 Boris Paichadze (Dinamo Tbilisi)
 Sergei Protsenko (Traktor Stalingrad)

References

 Soviet Union - List of final tables (RSSSF)

Soviet Top League seasons
1
Soviet
Soviet